Richard Maurice Wilkins (August 28, 1925 – October 21, 1997) was an American football end who played in the National Football League. He played college football at Oregon.

College career
Wilkins served in the Marine Corps during WWII before receiving a discharge after his vision was impaired when he was hit in the eye with a shell casing during training. He enrolled at the University of Oregon and joined the Webfoots basketball as a forward and baseball team as a pitcher. As a freshman, Wilkins was the leading scorer in the 1945 NCAA tournament with 22 points per game. He became the first Oregon player to score 1,000 career points and finished with 1,186. 

Wilkins was talked into joining the football team as a senior. In his lone season playing college football he led the Webfoots with 27 receptions (a Pacific Coast Conference record) for 520 yards and five touchdowns and was named first-team All-Pacific Coast.

Professional career
Wilkins was drafted by the New York Giants in the 25th round of the 1948 NFL Draft, but instead signed with the Los Angeles Dons of the All-America Football Conference. After the AAFC folded Wilkins was selected by the Los Angeles Rams in the third round of the 1950 AAFC dispersal draft. He was recalled by the Marine Corps before the draft and missed the next two seasons. Wilkins' rights were traded to the Dallas Texans in 1952 as part of an eleven player trade for Les Richter. Wilkins led the Texans with 32 receptions, 416 receiving yards and three touchdown catches in 1952. He did not play in 1953 in order to focus on his lumber business in Oregon. He was acquired by the Giants in a trade in 1954 and played in four games before suffering a shoulder injury.

Personal life
Wilkins was the father of Olympic gold medalist Mac Wilkins.

References

External links
Oregon Athletic Hall of Fame bio

1925 births
1997 deaths
Players of American football from Portland, Oregon
American football ends
Oregon Ducks football players
New York Giants players
Dallas Texans (NFL) players
Los Angeles Dons players
Forwards (basketball)
Oregon Ducks men's basketball players
Oregon Ducks baseball players